"Loving You Again" is a song by British singer-songwriter Chris Rea, which was released in 1987 as the second single from his ninth studio album Dancing with Strangers. The song was written and produced by Rea. "Loving You Again" reached No. 47 in the UK Singles Chart and remained in the Top 100 for four weeks.

Critical reception
On its release, Paul Massey of the Aberdeen Evening Express wrote, "Rea slips effortlessly into a relaxed, mellow ballad. Should be a huge hit." In a review of Dancing with Strangers, Helen Metella of the Edmonton Journal wrote, "From the opening track to the rapturous affirmation of commitment in 'Loving You Again', Rea sustains a deep caring for people without ever encroaching on the entertainment value of spirited soft-rock."

In a 2021 retrospective on Rea's "30 best tracks for the open road", Dig! picked "Loving You Again" as number 17 on the list. They noted the "not-so-subtle demonstration of soulful brass and sentimental lyricism" and the "influence of a more soul-based, Motown-inspired sound". They also described it as a "notable highlight" from Dancing with Strangers.

Track listing
7" single
 "Loving You Again" – 4:26
 "Donahue's Broken Wheel" – 3:00

7" single (Japanese release)
 "Loving You Again" – 4:26
 "I Don't Care Anymore" – 2:12

12" single
 "Loving You Again" – 5:40
 "Donahue's Broken Wheel" – 3:00
 "Danielle's Breakfast" – 4:35

Personnel
Loving You Again
 Chris Rea - vocals, guitar, strings, brass
 Kevin Leach - piano
 Eoghan O'Neill - bass
 Martin Ditcham - drums, percussion

Production
 Chris Rea - producer, mixing
 Jon Kelly - mixing
 Stuart Eales - engineer

Other
 Mark Entwisle - cover illustration

Charts

References

1987 songs
1987 singles
Chris Rea songs
Magnet Records singles
Songs written by Chris Rea